Rockbridge Alum Springs Historic District, also known as Jordan Alum Springs, and now known as Rockbridge Alum Springs - A Young Life Camp, is a historic 19th-century resort complex and national historic district near California, Rockbridge County, Virginia, United States. The district encompasses 16 contributing buildings, 10 contributing sites, and 4 contributing structures dating primarily to the 1850s, and associated with the operations of the Rockbridge Alum Springs, a popular 19th- and early-20th century mountain resort. The buildings are the barroom, store/post office, Montgomery Hall, the Gothic Building, the Alum Springs Pavilion, two cottages of Baltimore Row, the Ladies Hotel, four cottages of Kentucky Row, Jordan's House, a servant's quarters, a slave quarters, and a storehouse. The remaining structures are a well and the stone spring chambers and gazebo and bandstand of the Jordan Alum Springs. The sites are primarily those of demolished cottages. It is one of the best-preserved antebellum springs resort complexes in Virginia. The resort remained in operation until 1941.  It is currently owned and operated by Young Life, a non-denominational Christian youth organization, and has been operated as a year-round campground since 1992.

It was listed on the National Register of Historic Places in 1989.

References

External links
 "Taking the Waters: 19th Century Mineral Springs: Rockbridge Alum Springs." Claude Moore Health Sciences Library, University of Virginia
Rockbridge Alum Springs Young Life

Historic districts in Rockbridge County, Virginia
Historic districts on the National Register of Historic Places in Virginia
Hotel buildings completed in 1853
Hotel buildings on the National Register of Historic Places in Virginia
National Register of Historic Places in Rockbridge County, Virginia
1853 establishments in Virginia
Slave cabins and quarters in the United States